The Museum of Inuit Art (2007-2016), also known as MIA, was a museum in Toronto, Ontario, Canada located within the Queen's Quay Terminal at the Harbourfront Centre. It was devoted exclusively to Inuit art and culture.

Despite such popularity, it has been relatively difficult to view and learn the history of Inuit art in public institutions—a situation remedied by Toronto's Museum of Inuit Art.

Background:

With more than 6,000 square feet of exhibition space in the elegant Queen's Quay Terminal, the museum represents the largest permanent display of Inuit art in Canada. “It’s the first museum dedicated exclusively to Inuit art,” says adjunct curator Norman Zepp, “so the viewer gets a concentrated and focused experience.” The museum is also another landmark of the city's cultural renaissance, and is a welcome addition to a bustling lakeshore area that is home to Harbourfront Centre, which hosts a variety of outdoor festivals, live concerts and art shows at venues such as The Power Plant.

Four years in the making prior to its 2007 opening, the museum exists due to the efforts of David Harris—a former teacher in Nunavut and founder of a respected commercial gallery for Inuit art—and a group of dedicated partners. They include Zepp, who was the curator of Inuit art at the Art Gallery of Ontario from 1988 to 1994, Cynthia Waye—the museum's associate curator—and a number of enthusiastic private art collectors.

Housed in large display cases that evoke ice formations and the Arctic environment, the museum's more than 300 original pieces of art are composed of its in-house collection and a number of works on loan from private donors. The primary focus is sculpture—carved from stone, antler, ivory and bone—but prints, drawings and tapestries are also on display. Of these, a majority are from the Contemporary (around 1945 to 1990) and Post-Contemporary (1990s to today) periods, and represent the subjects, forms, media and, of course, artists associated with modern Inuit art. Works from earlier eras provide historical context, while maps, information panels and other interpretive materials ensure a comprehensive museum experience.

According to Zepp, visitors to the museum will not only see “some of the best art produced in the Canadian Arctic,” but will also gain “an understanding of the scope and breadth of Inuit art,” through accessible exhibits outlining common thematic elements and regional stylistic diversity. Temporary displays, like the current exhibit of wall hangings made by female artists in Baker Lake, are also illuminating.

AGE-OLD CULTURE
Though humans have lived in the Arctic for more than 4,000 years, the Inuit trace their ancestry back to the period around AD 1000, when the Thule people migrated across the Canadian territories from northern Alaska. The museum houses a selection of pieces from this ancestral epoch, including delicately carved figures and other objects of such historical importance that, although barely the size of a thimble, are practically priceless.

The museum also displays a selection of items from what is commonly referred to as Inuit art's Historic Period—an era beginning in the 16th century, when European whalers, missionaries and explorers came into contact with the Inuit. Ivory carvings of animals were commonly bartered goods, as were replicas of tools and other western-style objects.

ARTISTIC DIFFERENCES
Because a relatively small population was—and remains—dispersed across the vast swath of Arctic tundra, Inuit art took on regional distinctions over time, as hundreds of scattered family groups coalesced into the larger communities that exist today. Some of the museum's most dramatic works come from Cape Dorset, a community on Baffin Island where artists such as Osuitok Ipeelee, Pauta Saila and Latcholassie Akesuk incorporate an elegant, stylized naturalism into their representations of animals and mythological creatures.

The works at the museum reflect these regional differences, which are influenced by such factors as the availability of materials and the lifestyle particular to each community. Harris says that by displaying a range of regional styles, the museum helps visitors appreciate the distinctions between, for example, the large, semi-abstract Keewatin stone carvings commonly made in Baker Lake, and the realistic family-scene sculptures by Inukjuak-area artists in northern Quebec.

A MODERN INDUSTRY
The jewels of the Museum of Inuit Art are a selection of more recent sculptures created by acknowledged masters of the form, such as Joe Talirunili and Judas Ullulaq. Some of these works are individually showcased, and can be glimpsed through floor-to-ceiling windows by interested passers-by. They reflect the high quality not only of the museum's collection, but also of the work produced by Inuit artists since their introduction to mainstream audiences in the 1940s.

Since that time, the creation of sculptures, prints, tapestries and other art has been a vital social and economic force in Arctic communities. Today, Inuit artists typically produce and sell their work through the co-operative system—locally based organizations that, among other things, arrange distribution and help to ensure artists are given fair value for their work.

The adjoining Museum of Inuit Art Gallery receives its works through the co-operatives and honours their suggested sale prices. In this sense, the commercial gallery becomes something of an extension of the museum, where visitors can see the practical side of the Inuit art economy at work.

INSPIRATION AND INSIGHT
Once a teacher in the Cape Dorset community, fittingly, Harris says it is the museum's educational potential that excites him the most. Regardless of age or knowledge, visitors will be awed by an extensive collection of art, and will gain insight into the continuing evolution of one of Canada's many vibrant indigenous cultures.

“There’s a perception that the Inuit are a people of the past, that they aren’t a living and dynamic culture,” Harris says. “I hope that by understanding the art, people will leave the museum with an awareness of the current realities of life in the Arctic—an awareness of the changing culture and how the Inuit are rapidly becoming citizens of the world.”

The museum closed on May 29, 2016. This followed a decline in visitors and revenue following two summers of construction activity along Queens Quay West, which caused the temporary closure of streetcar access to the area of the museum.

Officially opened in June 2007, the museum existed due to the efforts of David Harris — a former teacher in Nunavut and founder of The Harris Inuit Gallery, a respected commercial gallery for Inuit art — and a group of dedicated partners.

Architecture
The MIA space was designed by gh3 inc. and has won two design awards: the Ontario Association of Architects Design Excellence Award, and the Canada Interiors’ Best of Canada Design Competition Award. “The interior of the museum was designed to remove visitors from the commercial clutter of the adjacent downtown shopping arcade and transport them to a more rarefied environment for viewing art — a neutral white shell evoking the iconic landscape forms of the arctic ice.”

Collection

Sprott

MIA acquired significant works through the generous sponsorship of Eric Sprott and the Sprott Acquisition Program in 2008.

The MIA Gallery - formerly Harris Gallery

The MIA Gallery originated from the Harris Inuit Gallery which opened November 8, 1998.  The Harris Gallery was located in the Queen's Quay building at 207 Queen's Quay West at Toronto Harbourfront. The gallery's founders, David and Nazie Harris, were formerly teachers on Baffin Island:  David Harris teacher grades 7/8 at Peter Pitseolak School Cape Dorset NWT 1997/1998  /  and Nazie Harris   College Business Writing Instructor at Arctic College Campus Cape Dorset NWT 1997

The mission of the gallery was as follows:

We remain grateful for the welcome and kindness that we received during our stay in the Arctic, and continue to experience between return visits. We hope to share this experience with our visitors from throughout the world, and we are pleased to provide information on our northern friends.

We would like to extend our best wishes to those who have already visited the gallery. To those first-time online visitors we look forward to meeting you on your next visit to Toronto. Thank you for visiting.

Sincerely,
Nazie and David Harris "

source: https://archive.org/web/web.php

With the opening of the Museum of Inuit Art within the Queen's Quay Terminal building in 2007, the Harris Gallery merged within the MIA Museum and was rebranded as the MIA Gallery.

MIA operated the MIA Gallery with former Harris Gallery co-director Nazie Harris serving as the MIA Gallery Manager.   The gallery featured collector quality, original works of art created by contemporary Inuit artists. As a non-profit institution,  all proceeds from the Museum of Inuit Art and the Museum of Inuit Art Gallery support cultural, educational and acquisition programs at the museum.

The sculptures, wall hangings, and original fine art prints on sale at MIA Gallery and Graphics Gallery were acquired from the various Inuit co-operatives that represent Inuit artists working in the North.  As such, all proceeds from the sale of art at the gallery directly supported the work of contemporary Inuit artists and their communities. The gallery also carried jewellery, packing dolls, and books on Inuit art.

Reciprocal partnerships
MIA was a reciprocal admissions partner with the Bata Shoe Museum, Design Exchange, and the Gardiner Museum.

Affiliations
MIA was affiliated with: CMA,  CHIN, and Virtual Museum of Canada.

Notes
Aboriginal Peoples Television Network (APTN)National News 7 August 2012, Donna Smith "Justin Bieber’s ‘Free Gas’ Comment Prompts Museum to Extend Invite" https://web.archive.org/web/20130429181612/http://aptn.ca/pages/news/2012/08/07/justin-biebers-free-gas-comment-prompts-museum-to-extend-invite/

CBC 3 August 2012, "Justin Bieber Chided by Aboriginal Group for Free Gas Comment" http://www.cbc.ca/news/arts/story/2012/08/03/justin-bieber-indian-inuit-rolling-stone-reaction.html

National Post 3 August 2012, Allison Cross "Justin Bieber Gets a Lesson in Native History After Singer's 'Free Gas' Remarks" http://news.nationalpost.com/2012/08/03/group-offers-justin-bieber-a-lesson-in-native-history-after-singers-free-gas-remarks/

Indian Country Today Media Network31 July 2012,  "Take That, Justin Bieber! Museum Offers Free Admission, Not Free Gas" http://indiancountrytodaymedianetwork.com/2012/07/31/take-that-justin-bieber-museum-offers-free-admission-not-free-gas-126825

Metro Morning 7 August 2012, Jane Hawtin, "Free Gas for Justin Bieber?" http://www.cbc.ca/metromorning/episodes/2012/08/07/free-gas-for-justin-bieber/

References

External links

 
 MIA Gallery

Art museums established in 2007
Defunct museums in Toronto
Art museums and galleries in Ontario
Defunct art museums and galleries
Inuit art
Indigenous museums in Canada
2007 establishments in Ontario
2016 disestablishments in Ontario
Art museums disestablished in 2016
Indigenous peoples in Toronto